Shakuntala is a 1943 costume drama film based on the Mahabharat episode of Shakuntala, directed by V. Shantaram. It was the first film made under the newly formed Rajkamal Kalamandir banner that Shantaram had started. It was the first film to be shown commercially in US. Adapted from the Shakuntala of Kalidas the screenplay was by Diwan Sharar. Music was composed by Vasant Desai  with lyrics by Diwan Sharar and Ratan Piya. 
The cinematatography was by V. Avadhoot and the film starred Kumar Ganesh, Jayashree, Chandra Mohan, Ameena, Shantaram, Zohra and Nana Palsikar.

Shakuntala was an adaptation of Kālidāsa's  Sanskrit drama Abhijñānaśākuntalam (Of Shakuntala who is recognized by a token) and appreciated "worldwide". The film initially sticks to the traditional version of Kalidas in the representation of Shakuntala, but later follows a "transformation" in the form of "empowerment of women" in Shakuntala's role, which is attributed to a critique of the play by Bankim Chatterjee.

Plot
Shakuntala (Jayshree) is the daughter of sage Vishwamitra and Menaka, but is brought up by the sage Kanva, and stays with him in a forest dwelling. She meets King Dushyanta (Chandra Mohan), when he comes there for a hunt. The two fall in love and get married, with Dushyanta staying with her. Soon he has to leave and he promises to come back for her. Before leaving he gives her a ring as a token of their marriage. Shakuntala passes her days waiting for Dushyanta. She is so lost in his thoughts that she doesn’t hear a sage asking for water. He then leaves her with a curse that the one she is thinking about will forget her. She gives birth to a son, Bharata and several years pass without the return of Dushyanta who has lost his memory and has no recollection of Shakuntala. The ring he has given her is lost in the river and swallowed by a fish. Dushyanta turns her away when Shakuntala goes to the court. Later when Dushyanta recovers his memory Shakuntala refuses to go with him but both are finally united.

Cast
 Kumar Ganesh as Bharat
 Jayashree as Shakuntala
Chandra Mohan as King Dushyanta
 Shantaram as Priyamvad
 Ameena
 Madan Mohan
Zohra as Menaka
Nana Palsikar
 Vilas
 Raja Pandit
 Shantarin
 Vidya

Review
Shakuntala was the first Indian film to be shown in the US. The New York Times of 1947 stated that "Shakuntala has a charm entirely its own". Calling it a "fairy-tale"  the reviewer praised the background, and commented on the "unabashed naïveté of acting of the entire cast", and the "crudely rich musical score" but called it "a sturdy screen promise". The film has been cited as a "major hit" and was shown at a theatre in India for continuous 104 weeks.

Award
The film was nominated for the Grand International Award at the 1947 Venice Film Festival.

Soundtrack
The film was composed by Vasant Desai, who had earlier provided background music in Shantaram’s films. This was Desai's first independent music venture and continued to have a long association with Shantaram's films. The lyricists were Diwan Sharar and Ratan Piya. The singers were Jayashree, Zohrabai Ambalewali, Parshuram and Amirbai Karnataki.

Song list

References

External links

 Songs Audio at Surjit Singh - Shakuntala songs

1940s Hindi-language films
1943 films
Indian black-and-white films
Films directed by V. Shantaram
Indian drama films
Indian epic films
1943 drama films
Hindi-language drama films
Films based on works by Kalidasa
Works based on Shakuntala (play)